Vincent John Dellay (June 23, 1907, Union City, New Jersey – April 16, 1999, Hasbrouck Heights, New Jersey) was an American banker, World War II veteran, and politician who represented New Jersey's 14th congressional district in the United States House of Representatives for one term from 1957 to 1959.

Originally elected as a Republican, Dellay announced in 1957 that he would support Democratic candidate Robert B. Meyner for Governor of New Jersey and would caucus with the Democrats in Congress.

Early life and career
Dellay was born to Italian immigrant parents in what is now Union City, New Jersey on June 23, 1907. He was a longtime resident of West New York, New Jersey. Dellay was educated in West New York High School, New York Evening High School, and the American Institute of Banking. He rose from messenger to bookkeeper at Irving Trust, New York City from 1923 to 1929; was assistant comptroller, Sterling National Bank & Trust Co., New York City, from 1929-1936; and an auditor with the New Jersey Department of the Treasury from 1936-1956.

World War II
During World War II, Dellay served in the United States Navy from 1944-1945 and in the New Jersey National Guard from 1949-1960.

Congress
Dellay was an unsuccessful candidate for election to the Eighty-fourth Congress in 1954. He was elected as a Republican to the Eighty-fifth Congress, serving in office from January 3, 1957 to January 3, 1959.

Dellay voted in favor of the Civil Rights Act of 1957.

Party change
He decided to change political affiliation from Republican to Democrat during the Eighty-fifth Congress. He was an unsuccessful candidate for nomination as an Independent to the Eighty-sixth Congress.

Death
He was a field auditor for the New Jersey Department of the Treasury until his retirement in 1971.

A resident of Hasbrouck Heights, New Jersey, Dellay died at the age of 91 on April 16, 1999, at Hackensack University Medical Center. He was interred in Arlington National Cemetery, Arlington, Virginia.

References

External links
Vincent John Dellay at The Political Graveyard

1907 births
1999 deaths
20th-century American politicians
United States Navy personnel of World War II
American people of Italian descent
Memorial High School (West New York, New Jersey) alumni
New Jersey Independents
Democratic Party members of the United States House of Representatives from New Jersey
People from Hasbrouck Heights, New Jersey
Politicians from Union City, New Jersey
People from West New York, New Jersey
United States Army soldiers
Burials at Arlington National Cemetery
Republican Party members of the United States House of Representatives from New Jersey
People from Union City, New Jersey